The Jaipur Metro(Hindi: जयपुर मेट्रो)  is a rapid transit system in the city of Jaipur, Rajasthan, India. Construction on the mostly elevated part of the first line, called Phase 1A, comprising  of route from Mansarovar to Chandpole Bazaar, started in November 2010, and was completed in 2014. The Jaipur Metro began commercial service between Chandpole and Mansarovar on 3 June 2015. The Jaipur Metro Rail system is India's sixth metro rail system after those in Kolkata, Delhi, Bangalore, Gurugram and Mumbai.
The Jaipur Metro is the first metro in India to run on triple-storey elevated road and metro track. Phase 1-B, from Chandpole to Badi Chaupar, began operation on 23 September 2020.

History

Background 
With the rapid industrialization and commercial development of Jaipur, teamed with a growing population, the transport infrastructure of the city was found to be overburdened. As a result, the government mulled over establishment of Jaipur Metro on the lines of Delhi Metro which had proved to be a great success.

JMRC Ltd. 
The Jaipur Metro Rail Corporation Ltd., abbreviated to JMRC, is a state-owned company that operates the Jaipur Metro. The Jaipur Metro Rail Corporation Ltd. was created on 1 January 2010 BY MR AJAY GHOSH   serving as the MANGING DIRECTOR.
Among the Rapid Transit systems of India, it has been recorded fastest to conduct of trial run after starting construction, when it commenced trial runs in Jaipur on 18 September 2013 flagged off by the then Chief Minister of Rajasthan Shri Ashok Gehlot.

Construction 
Physical construction work on the Jaipur Metro started on 24 February 2011. JMRC consulted the DMRC on rapid transit operation and construction techniques.

The first line of the Jaipur Metro was opened to public by Vasundhara Raje, the Chief Minister of Rajasthan, on 3 June 2015, and thus, it became the sixth rapid transit system in India. Phase 1-B of the project started operating on 23 September 2020.

Network 

The Jaipur Metro is being built in 2 phases. Phase I consists of the Pink Line and Phase II consists of the Orange Line. Currently, the Orange Line is under construction. The implementation of Phase 1A of the project (Mansarover to Chandpole having the length of about 9.63 km) including the civil works, permanent way, depot and traction and power supply, etc. was being managed by DMRC.

The remainder of the first line, Phase I-B [, 2 stations], got completed by 23 September 2020.  Phase II (20 stations) is planned to be completed by 2021. With the completion of Phases 1 and  II, the network will span  and 31 stations.

Pink Line 

The first route of Jaipur Metro (East-West Corridor) connect Mansarovar to Badi Chaupar via Civil Lines and Chandpole. In Phase I-A, the metro was operating between Mansarovar to Chandpole. The construction of Phase-1B between Chandpole and Badi Chaupar is completed.
This is the Metro line that got flagged off on 5 June 2015, and has been named as Pink Line, as it takes passengers to the Pink City. The depot for this line is situated at Mansarovar.

Jaipur Metro was planned to be built in phases. Phase-1A (9.63 km) was completed in 2014, and Phase-1B was completed in 2020 and Phase II is scheduled for completion in 2020.

Phase 1B 
The Pink Line was realized with the completion of Phase 1B (2 stations), which is got completed in September 2020. The tunnel excavation work between Chandpole and Badi Chaipar completed in August 2017, civil work to complete by October 2019. Trial running completed in January 2020. On 23 September 2020 it has been opened to public. It now completes the Pink Line. Details of the line are:

Phase 1C 
For Phase 1C, Jaipur Metro Rail Corporation (JMRC) plans to extend the Pink Line from Badi Chaupar to Transport Nagar. For the same, the corporation has prepared a detailed project report (DPR) of Phase 1C by taking public suggestions. According to the DPR, the estimated project cost will be Rs 856 crore, including cost of land and taxes, The total length of the project will be 2.85 km (2.26 km Underground and 0.59 km Elevated). This project is expected to be completed till March 2025 if the construction takes place. Once constructed, the estimated ridership between the entire stretch, Mansarovar to Transport Nagar, will be over 1.38 lakh till 2031.

Phase 1D 
For Phase 1D, Jaipur Metro Rail Corporation (JMRC) plans to extend the Pink Line from Mansarovar to Ajmer Road. For the same, the corporation is preparing a detailed project report (DPR) of Phase 1D by taking public suggestions.

Phase 2 

Phase 2 (North-South Corridor) which is scheduled for completion in 2021. The Orange Line will be  and serve 20 stations when complete. This will connect Sitapura Industrial Area in the South to Ambabari in the North via Ajmeri Gate and MI Road. The tracks will be elevated between Sitapura and Ajmeri Gate and then will go underground. There might be some changes in plan before actual construction starts on these lines.

Current route

Finances 
The state government would be directly funding  while the rest would be borne by other wings of state urban development and housing departments.
The Phase-II is expected to cost  crore for which government is mulling over PPP mode.

Operations 

A concession for operation and maintenance of the Stage 1 and Stage 2 is to be let on PPP basis.

Trains operate at a frequency of 10 to 15 minutes between 6:45 and 21:00 depending peak and off-peak time. Automated station announcements are recorded in Hindi and English. Many stations have services such as Parking lot, ATMs and mobile recharge. Eating, drinking, smoking, and chewing of gum are prohibited in the entire system. The metro also has a sophisticated fire alarm system for advance warning in emergencies, and fire retardant material is used in trains as well as on the premises of stations. Navigation information will sooner be available on Google Transit. The first coach of every train is reserved for women.

Security

The responsibility of security of Jaipur Metro has been entrusted to Rajasthan Police. A strength of 789 police personnel has been sanctioned for security and policing of Jaipur Metro. Latest security equipments have been provided at all Metro Stations. Closed-circuit cameras from IndigoVision are used to monitor trains and stations, and feed from these is monitored by Rajasthan Police and Jaipur Metro authorities at their respective control rooms. In addition metal detectors, X-ray baggage inspection systems, and dog squads are also deployed which are used to secure the system. Each of the underground stations has about 45 to 50 cameras installed while the elevated stations have about 16 to 20 cameras each. The monitoring of these cameras is done by the Rajasthan Police, which is in charge of security of the Metro, as well as the Jaipur Metro Rail Corporation. Intercoms are provided in each train car for emergency communication between the passengers and the train operator. Periodic security drills are carried out at stations and on trains to ensure preparedness of security agencies in emergency situations.

Ticketing & Recharge

For the convenience of customers, Jaipur Metro commuters have three choices for ticket purchase. Fares are calculated based on the origin and destination stations using a fare chart and it also depends on peak rush in Metro. Travel cards are available for longer durations and are most convenient for frequent commuters. A deposit of  needs to be made to buy a new card which is refundable on the return of the card any time before its expiry if the card is not physically damaged. Tourist cards can be used for unlimited travel on the Jaipur Metro network over short periods of time. There are two kinds of tourist cards valid for one and three days respectively.
Jaipur Metro also has introduced a Combo Card. JMRC has already entered into a MoU with HDFC Bank and accordingly co-branded Combo Cards will be issued by HDFC Bank which will be used on Jaipur Metro system just like Daily Commuter Smart Cards issued by Jaipur Metro.

Rolling stock 
The Metro uses  standard gauge rolling stock. Trains are maintained at Mansarovar Deport for Pink Line. In December 2011 BEML was awarded a  contract to supply 10 four-car trains for Phase 1. The Jaipur Metro plans to lengthen the trains later to 6 coaches as the traffic increases. BEML expects a follow-on order worth 

Thus these rolling stocks are said to be indigenous and are manufactured by BEML at its factory in Bangalore. The trains are four-car consists with a capacity of 1506 commuters per train, accommodating 50 seated and 292 standing passengers in each coach.

The Rolling Stock used on this line is similar to the Rolling stock on the Violet and Green Lines on Delhi Metro

Signalling and Telecommunication

The Jaipur Metro uses cab signalling along with a centralised automatic train control system consisting of Automatic Train Protection and automatic train signalling modules. Jaipur Metro has proposed that it will have automatic train operation also in future. A 380 MHz digital trunked TETRA radio communication system from Cassidian is used on all lines to carry both voice and data information. An integrated system comprising optical fibre cable, on-train radio, CCTV, and a centralised clock and public address system is used for telecommunication during train operations as well as emergencies.

Environment and aesthetics

A major advantage of metro is that it reduces per person carbon emission by a very significant amount.

Jaipur Metro has been decorated by the artwork of heritage wall of Jaipur inside and outside of the Metro. Metro stations also have the same kind of artwork.

Controversies 
On 10 March 2011, the Rajasthan High Court issued show cause notices to state authorities, JMRC, and JDA's land acquisition officer, on petition by some shop owners from Station Road, asking them to justify the Jaipur Metro Project, as petitioners alleged no proper survey was done before construction of the Pink Line began.

There were some accidents at the Metro project site, injuring laborers and passers-by, attracting criticism for lack of security measures. In one incident, an 18 feet wall collapsed killing two men. A case was registered against the firm DSC Limited which was involved in construction. There were reports of heightened fears among people that sub-letting of the work by the major contractors could be compromising the safety standards.

The Phase I-B of Jaipur Metro has recently come up with huge uproar because its construction can result in risks to some UNESCO World Heritage Sites, including Hawa Mahal, Jantar Mantar and Isarlat Swargasuli Tower. Construction on this section of the Pink Line would have costed .

Phase I-B is also not in accordance with Jaipur's archaeological laws, which states that any kind of digging/tunneling work in the vicinity of heritage sites is not allowed. The Badi Chaupar and Choti Chaupar have already been removed for Metro work. According to the archaeological laws, whoever destroys, injures, mutilates, defaces, alters, removes, disperses, misuses, imperils or allows to fall into decay a protected monument, or  removes from a protected monument any sculpture, carving image, bas-relief, inscription or other like object, shall be punishable with imprisonment for a term which may extend to six months with a fine which may extend to five thousand rupees or with both.

The project also caused huge losses of business activities of shopkeepers, as the city's market will remain either closed or operative in barricades only.

Network Map

See also

References

Further reading 
 Revised Detailed Project Report on Jaipur Metro by DMRC
 Jaipur Metro A Brief Note on the Project

External links

 Jaipur Metro Rail Corporation Ltd.
 Jaipur Metro Guide 

 
Transport in Jaipur
Standard gauge railways in India
2015 establishments in Rajasthan
25 kV AC railway electrification